South Padre International Music Festival (also known as SPI Music Fest) is an annual 3-day music festival held on South Padre Island, Texas. The event features international and national artists, encompassing a wide range of musical genres including country, funk, reggae, rock, indie, Latin rock, ska and jazz. 2007 marked the inaugural year of SPI Music Fest with almost 10,000 visitors throughout the weekend. The festival producer is GamePlan Marketing & Events, a strategic marketing and advertising agency located in Austin, Texas. 

The festival is set in a tropical atmosphere with temperatures averaging high 70s in late October and early November.

History
When The South Padre Convention and Visitors Bureau had a goal to attract visitors during the fall off-season, it held a bidding for a music festival. GamePlan Marketing & Events was selected and began the process of producing a music festival that would help South Padre be a cultural entertainment destination, attracting worldwide tourism. Early visions for a music festival included concerts on the sand flats north of the South Padre Island Convention Centre. However, the producer and CVB agreed they wanted to put the concerts near the businesses to better help the local economy. November 2–4, 2007 marked the inaugural SPI Music Fest. The 2008 date for SPI Music Fest will occur on October 31-November 2.

2008 lineup

Willie Nelson
Foghat
Los Lonely Boys
Blue Öyster Cult
Ghostland Observatory
Steel Pulse
Alejandro Escovedo
Del Castillo
Grupo Fantasma
Fastball
Sara Hickman
Vallejo
Airline
meridianwest
Nakia and his Southern Cousins
Pelican West
The Last Vegas
Ginger Leigh
Twanguero
Bongodogs
Stewart Mann & the Statesboro Revue
James Speer
Big Burn
Brownout
Phillip Thomas Kellogg
Suzanna Choffel
Eric Hanke
Bree Stevens

More to come…www.spimusicfest.com for updated lineup

2007 lineup
More than 60 bands in 14 venues were officially involved in the 2007 South Padre International Music Festival. Musical acts included: 

Jaguares
Robert Earl Keen
Robert Randolph & the Family Band
Reckless Kelly
Plastilina Mosh
Grupo Fantasma
Los Amigos Invisibles
Dirty Dozen Brass Band
Jumbo
Patrice Pike
Mike Doughty
Trombone Shorty & Orleans Avenue
Suzanna Choffel
Jumbo
Meridian West
Boombox
Big Burn
Kathleen Braun
Hope for the Stars
Gerry's Kids
Pelican West Band
Stewart Mann
Frontera Jazz Quartet
Haydn Vitera
Joy Davis
Eric Hanke
Third Coast
Peoples Army
Bongodogs
Twanguero!
Leslie Blasing
Wesley Cox
On the Roadside Allstars
Honeybrowne
Rabanes
Bombasta
Papa Mali
Jesus War
Danny Schmidt
Ideophonic
Brownout
Carrie Elkin
Two Tons of Steel
The Authors
Green Mountain Grass
Amy Atchley
Espina
Billy Harvey
Airline
Homer Hiccolm & the Rocketboys
Eidman Hall
Nakia and his Southern Cousins
Amy Cook
Ruby James
Pilaseca
Miser
Stereo Kitsch
Slim Richey
Jitterbug Vipers
Leonhardt
The Throwbacks
The Gospel Silverstones
Moving Matter
DJ Gmau
Philip Thomas Kellogg

Weather
The average temperature for South Padre Island during the last week of October and the first week of November is 80' (average high) and 66' (average low).

Gallery

References

Music festivals in Texas
Tourist attractions in Cameron County, Texas